"Happy Returns" is an episode of the BBC sitcom, Only Fools and Horses. It was the first episode of series 4, and was first broadcast on 21 February 1985. In the episode, when Del discovers that Rodney's latest girlfriend is the daughter of an old flame, he suspects she might be his daughter.

Synopsis
The latest object of Rodney's love is an attractive newsagent worker named Debbie. Meanwhile, Del Boy prevents a young boy from getting hit by a speeding car. That night, Del comes across the boy again, who tells him that he is running away from home because he got into trouble with his mother for letting the air out of the tyres on the Trotters' van. Del tells him that they will go and tell the boy's mother that he had asked the youngster to deflate the tyres on the Reliant Regal van, to convince the boy to return home.

The boy's mother is June Snell, one of Del's ex-girlfriends from the 1960s. When Rodney unexpectedly arrives to see Debbie (from the newsagent), Del realises that June is Debbie's mother too. In order to leave the courting couple alone, he and June go to The Nag's Head to talk about old times, although June is reluctant to reveal why she left Del so suddenly when they were a couple. However, when the barmaid unwittingly reveals that Debbie's 19th birthday is imminent, Del deduces that June left him because she was pregnant with his child. Quickly, he returns to June's flat to stop Rodney committing "an act of incense". Rodney demands to know why it is Del's choice who he dates. Del tells him the story. Horrified, Rodney pleads with Del to ask June if he is definitely Debbie's father.

The next night, June comes clean; Albie Littlewood – not Del – is really the father. Albie was Del's best friend, who June was cheating on Del with. For 19 years, Del had suffered survivor guilt over Albie's death. He believed Albie had died whilst using the railway line as a short cut when on his way to meet him at the pub (Albie's bicycle had fallen onto a live rail and electrocuted him). June informs Del that Albie was actually on his way to see her, so he has nothing to feel guilty about. But Del tells June that is not the cause of his guilt. The real cause of his guilt is that even if Albie had made it to the pub that fateful night, Del would not have been there to meet him; Del was busy cheating on June with Deidre, Albie's girlfriend.

Just when the farce appears to be resolved, Del realises it is too late, as Debbie has now fallen for Mickey Pearce. As Del leaves the flat, he sarcastically tells a confused Mickey not to take a shortcut across the railway line.

The events of this episode are mentioned by Debbie's mum, June, in "A Royal Flush".

Episode cast

Production
Lennard Pearce died from a heart attack shortly after filming of the fourth series began. "Hole in One", originally scheduled as the series opener, had been partially filmed with Pearce before his death. John Sullivan wrote this episode to replace "Hole in One" as the series opener and the following episode, "Strained Relations", to write Grandad's death into the series. During this episode, it is briefly mentioned that Grandad is in hospital. Pearce's photo was also omitted from the opening title sequence, with only David Jason and Nicholas Lyndhurst appearing.

References

External links

Only Fools and Horses (series 4) episodes
1985 British television episodes